SunTrust Building may refer to:

SunTrust Plaza in Atlanta, Georgia
SunTrust Building in Atlanta, Georgia
SunTrust Center in Orlando, Florida
SunTrust Financial Centre in Tampa, Florida
SunTrust International Center in Miami, Florida
SunTrust Building (Nashville) in Nashville, Tennessee
SunTrust Plaza (Nashville) in Nashville, Tennessee
SunTrust Plaza (Richmond) in Richmond, Virginia